Frederick John Green  (6 March 1921 – 7 January 1983) was an Australian rules footballer who played with Essendon and St Kilda in the Victorian Football League (VFL).

Football
Although he was not as tall as other ruckmen, Green was an effective knock ruckman during his career and also spent some time as a defender. 

He played in Essendon's losing 1941 Grand Final team and left the club in 1944 due to Naval commitments.

Stationed in Canberra, Green captained the Navy side which competed in the CANFL and led them to the 1944 premiership. He continued playing in 1945 and won a Mulrooney Medal as the league's 'Best and fairest' player. 

Green returned to Essendon in 1946 before crossing to St Kilda the following season. He celebrated his 100th VFL game with a five-point win over Fitzroy in 1950. Green captained St Kilda from 1949 to 1950 and was their playing coach in 1951.

Honours
He was made a Commander of the Most Excellent Order of the British Empire (CBE) in the 1977 New Year Honours List, for "public service".

Death
He died at the Gold Coast Hospital in Southport, Queensland on 7 January 1983.

Notes

References
 Holmesby, Russell and Main, Jim (2007). The Encyclopedia of AFL Footballers. 7th ed. Melbourne: Bas Publishing.
 Maplestone, M., Flying Higher: History of the Essendon Football Club 1872–1996, Essendon Football Club, (Melbourne), 1996. 
 World War Two Nominal Roll: Private Frederick John Green (V311047), Department of Veterans' Affairs.
 World War Two Nominal Roll: Leading Radio Mechanic Frederick John Green (26989), Department of Veterans' Affairs.
 World War Two Service Record: Leading Radio Mechanic Frederick John Green (26989), National Archives of Australia.

External links

1921 births
1983 deaths
Australian rules footballers from Melbourne
Essendon Football Club players
St Kilda Football Club coaches
St Kilda Football Club players
Royal Australian Navy personnel of World War II
People from Albert Park, Victoria
Military personnel from Melbourne